Ambar Niel Sengupta is an Indian-American mathematician. He is a professor of mathematics at the University of Connecticut.

Education and career

Ambar Sengupta attended Presidency College, Calcutta and stood first class first in the BSc (Mathematics Honours) examination of the University of Calcutta in 1984. He then joined Cornell University, where he obtained an MS and then a PhD under the supervision of Leonard Gross in 1990.

After a post-doctoral appointment in the Physics Department of Princeton University, he joined Louisiana State University.  He became a professor of mathematics in 2003, and he was awarded the Hubert Butts Alumni Professorship in 2011. Sengupta joined the Mathematics faculty of the University of Connecticut as Professor and Head of the Department in 2016.

Professional activities
Sengupta's contributions have been in the fields of pure mathematics, mathematical physics, and financial mathematics.

He used this to mathematically prove formulas that had been used in the physics literature and discovered new formulas for non-trivial bundles. He gave a rigorous proof of Edward Witten's formula for the volume of the moduli space of flat connections on a compact oriented surface, and proved that the Yang-Mills measure converges to this limiting measure. He is an initiator of the rigorous study of the large-N limit of Yang-Mills theory in two dimensions. He and Michael Anshelevich showed that the limit of the U(N) Yang-Mills measure for the plane is described by free probability theory, confirming ideas initiated by I. M. Singer. He has published extensively in infinite-dimensional geometry and measure theory, as well as higher gauge theory.

He has served as doctoral advisor or co-advisor to 8 PhD students.

Ambar Sengupta is the founding Managing Editor of the Journal of Stochastic Analysis. He is a Council Member of the New England Statistical Society.

Awards and honors
Ambar Sengupta was awarded a Humboldt fellowship in 1995. He was named a Mercator Fellow by the Deutsche Forschungsgemeinschaft (German Research Foundation) in 2011; he was invited to a visiting professorship at the University of Bonn with this award.

Selected publications

References

External links

1963 births
20th-century American mathematicians
Living people
Presidency University, Kolkata alumni
Cornell University alumni
University of Connecticut faculty
21st-century American mathematicians